Been may refer to:
To be
Have been
Been (surname)
Beens, an ethnic group of Bangladesh
Pungi or been, an Indian wind instrument
Rudra veena or been, a string instrument

See also
Bean (disambiguation)